Vlahovo may refer to the following places:

 Vlahovo, Bulgaria, village in Smolyan Province, Bulgaria
 Vlahovo (Svrljig), village in the municipality of Svrljig, Serbia
 Vlahovo (Žitorađa), village in the municipality of Žitorađa, Serbia